Guido Grünheid (born 25 October 1982) is a German former professional basketball player.

Professional career
During his pro career, Grünheid played with several German League clubs. He also played in the Greek League, with Aigaleo, and in the Dutch League with Hanzevast Capitals.

National team career
Grünheid was also a member of the senior German national team. With Germany, he played at the 2006 FIBA World Cup and the 2007 EuroBasket.

External links
Profile at beko-bbl.de 
Profile at eurobasket.com
Profile at real-gm.com
Profile at donarmuseum.nl 

1982 births
Living people
2006 FIBA World Championship players
Aigaleo B.C. players
Alba Berlin players
Artland Dragons players
Donar (basketball club) players
Dutch Basketball League players
German men's basketball players
Köln 99ers players
People from Bezirk Gera
Sportspeople from Jena
Power forwards (basketball)
Small forwards